There have been three baronetcies created for members of the Ingilby/Ingleby family, one in the Baronetage of England, one in the Baronetage of Great Britain and one in the Baronetage of the United Kingdom. The latter title is extant while the other two creations are extinct.

The Ingleby Baronetcy, of Ripley Castle in the County of York, was created in the Baronetage of England on 17 May 1642 for William Ingleby. This creation became extinct on the death of his great-grandson, the fourth Baronet, in 1772.

The Ingilby Baronetcy, of Ripley Castle in the County of York, was created in the Baronetage of Great Britain on 8 June 1781 for John Ingilby. He was the illegitimate son of the fourth Baronet of the 1642 creation and had succeeded to the Ingilby estates on the death of his father. Ingilby later represented East Retford in the House of Commons. His son, the second Baronet, sat as a Member of Parliament for East Retford, Lincolnshire and Lincolnshire North. He had already in 1807 succeeded his maternal grandfather in the Amcotts Baronetcy of Kettlethorp Park according to a special remainder. However, on his death in 1854 both baronetcies became extinct.

The Ingilby Baronetcy, of Ripley Castle in the County of York and of Harrington in the County of Lincoln, was created in the Baronetage of the United Kingdom on 26 July 1866 for Henry Ingilby. He was the eldest son of Reverend Henry Ingilby, brother of the first Baronet of the 1781 creation, and had succeeded to the family estates on the death of his cousin.

Ingleby baronets, of Ripley Castle (1642)

Sir William Ingleby, 1st Baronet (–1652)
Sir William Ingleby, 2nd Baronet (1621–1682)
Sir John Ingleby, 3rd Baronet (1664–1742)
Sir John Ingleby, 4th Baronet (c. 1705–1772)

Ingilby later Amcotts-Ingilby baronets, of Ripley Castle (1781)
Sir John Ingilby, 1st Baronet (1758–1815)
Sir William Amcotts-Ingilby, 2nd Baronet (1783–1854)

Ingilby baronets, of Ripley Castle and Harrington (1866)

Sir Henry John Ingilby, 1st Baronet (1790–1870)
Sir Henry Day Ingilby, 2nd Baronet (1826–1911)
Sir William Ingilby, 3rd Baronet (1829–1918)
Sir William Henry Ingilby, 4th Baronet (1874–1950)
Sir Joslan William Vivian Ingilby, 5th Baronet (1907–1974)
Sir Thomas Colvin William Ingilby, 6th Baronet (born 1955)

The heir apparent to the baronetcy is James William Francis Ingilby (born 1985), eldest son of the 6th Baronet and his wife, Emma, Lady Ingilby.

See also
Amcotts baronets

Notes

References
Kidd, Charles, Williamson, David (editors). Debrett's Peerage and Baronetage (1990 edition). New York: St Martin's Press, 1990.

External links
Ripley Castle
Ingilby Family History Site

Baronetcies in the Baronetage of the United Kingdom
Extinct baronetcies in the Baronetage of England
Extinct baronetcies in the Baronetage of Great Britain
 
Recusants